Todd Sweeris (born May 28, 1973) is an American table tennis player. He competed at the 1996 Summer Olympics and the 2000 Summer Olympics.

References

External links
 

1973 births
Living people
American male table tennis players
Olympic table tennis players of the United States
Table tennis players at the 1996 Summer Olympics
Table tennis players at the 2000 Summer Olympics
Sportspeople from Grand Rapids, Michigan
Pan American Games medalists in table tennis
Pan American Games gold medalists for the United States
Table tennis players at the 1999 Pan American Games
Medalists at the 1999 Pan American Games
20th-century American people